Ak-Buura Game Reserve is a protected area in Kara-Suu District, Osh Region, Kyrgyzstan. It was established in 1975 with a purpose of conserving breeding areas of pheasant, see-see partridge, and chukar.  The reserve covers 10,000 hectares in the Ak-Buura river valley.

References
 

Game reserves in Kyrgyzstan
Protected areas established in 1975